Marian Tomasz Goliński (16 July 1949 in Radom – 11 June 2009 in Andrzejów Duranowski) was a Polish politician who was a Mayor of Szczecinek (1990–2005) and a Member of the Sejm of Poland (1997–2001, 2005–2009).

Biography

Political career 
In the 1997 parliamentary election he joined the Sejm of the Republic of Poland (lower house of the Polish parliament) III term representing the 20th (Koszalin) district as a candidate from the Solidarity Electoral Action list.

In the 2002 local election he was a candidate for Mayor of Szczecinek. In the First Ballot he pooled 5,906 votes (43.43%). In the Second Ballot he scored 6,226 votes (52.89%) and he beat Jerzy Hardie-Douglas, candidate of POPiS local coalition.

After the 2005 parliamentary election he returned to the Sejm of Poland. In 40th district, as a candidate from the Law and Justice list, he polled 5,408 votes and was elected to the Sejm V term.

In the 2005 parliamentary election he was re-elected to the Sejm VI term, representing the 40th (Koszalin) district, as a candidate from the Law and Justice list. He polled 8,352 votes.

He died in a road accident on 11 June 2009 in Andrzejów Duranowski, near Sochaczew, Masovian Voivodeship.

Personal life 
With his wife, he had four children, one son and three daughters.

See also 
 Members of Polish Sejm 1997-2001
 Members of Polish Sejm 2005-2007
 Members of Polish Sejm 2007-2011

References

External links 
 (Polish) www.Golinski.pl

1949 births
2009 deaths
People from Radom
Members of the Polish Sejm 1997–2001
Members of the Polish Sejm 2005–2007
Members of the Polish Sejm 2007–2011
Law and Justice politicians
Road incident deaths in Poland